Dahanu Assembly constituency is one of the 288 Vidhan Sabha (Legislative Assembly) constituencies of Maharashtra state in western India.

Overview
Dahanu constituency is one of the 6 Vidhan Sabha constituencies located in the Palghar district. It is reserved for the candidates belonging to the Scheduled tribes. It comprises the entire Talasari tehsil and part of Dahanu tehsil of the district.

Dahanu is part of the Palghar Lok Sabha constituency along with five other Vidhan Sabha segments, namely, Vikramgad, Palghar, Boisar, Nalasopara and Vasai in Palghar district.

Members of Legislative assembly

Election results

2019 results

2014 results

2009 results

2004 results

See also
 Dahanu
 List of constituencies of Maharashtra Vidhan Sabha

References

Assembly constituencies of Palghar district
Assembly constituencies of Maharashtra